Francis Ricardo Ferrero Fidalgo (born October 1, 1972) is an Argentine naturalized Chilean former footballer who played in Chile, Mexico and Venezuela.

Personal life
He naturalized Chilean by residence.

Honours
Colo-Colo
 Chilean Primera División: 1996
 Copa Chile: 1996

References

External links
 Profile at BDFA 
 Francis Ferrero at MemoriaWanderers.cl 

1972 births
Living people
People from San Luis, Argentina
Argentine footballers
Argentine expatriate footballers
Argentine emigrants to Chile
Naturalized citizens of Chile
Chilean footballers
Chilean expatriate footballers
Villa Dálmine footballers
Puerto Montt footballers
Colo-Colo footballers
Santiago Wanderers footballers
Santiago Morning footballers
Deportivo Miranda F.C. players
Unión San Felipe footballers
Real Sociedad de Zacatecas footballers
Coquimbo Unido footballers
Unión Española footballers
Primera C Metropolitana players
Chilean Primera División players
Venezuelan Primera División players
Ascenso MX players
Primera B de Chile players
Argentine expatriate sportspeople in Chile
Argentine expatriate sportspeople in Venezuela
Argentine expatriate sportspeople in Mexico
Chilean expatriate sportspeople in Venezuela
Chilean expatriate sportspeople in Mexico
Expatriate footballers in Chile
Expatriate footballers in Venezuela
Expatriate footballers in Mexico
Association football forwards